The 17th Critics' Choice Awards were presented on January 12, 2012 at the Hollywood Palladium, honoring the finest achievements of 2011 filmmaking. The ceremony was broadcast on VH1, and hosted by Rob Huebel and Paul Scheer. The nominees were announced on December 13, 2011.

Winners and nominees

Joel Siegel Award
Sean Penn

Music+Film Award
Martin Scorsese

Statistics

References

External links
 17th Annual Critics' Choice Movie Awards (2012) – Best Picture: The Artist at Critics Choice Association

Broadcast Film Critics Association Awards
2011 film awards